Anarchic Adjustment was a fashion clothing company founded in London in 1986 by Nick Philip and popularized internationally in San Francisco California by designer and entrepreneur Alan Brown, along with Charles Uzzell Edwards. London's post-punk Anarchic Adjustment moved to California with the arrival of co-founder Nick Philip to the freestyle bicycle/skate scene of Southern California.

Nick briefly worked at Freestylin' magazine where a 14-year-old Spike Jonze was an aspiring photographer under the stewardship of Windy Osborne, freestyle bicycle rider R. L. Osborn's sister. Spike did some early photographic work for Ozone Freestyle and Anarchic during this time.

Nick Philip met Alan Brown, designer and owner of Ozone Freestyle Bicycle Company in 1988 at an AFA (American Freestyle Association) contest. Alan understood the potential of Anarchic and was instrumental in bringing Anarchic from an idea consisting of three T-shirt designs to an internationally known fashion company.

Charles Uzzell Edwards  joined Alan and Nick and together developed the "Anarchic" line which was noted for its beautifully bizarre graphics, textures, and outrageously profound designs.

Anarchic Adjustment opened two fashion shops in Japan, one opened in Tokyo in 1994, west of Ebisu station  and a second store in the American Village in Osaka inside the American Village Parco Store. Alan Brown, along with Joi Ito were responsible for founding the Anarchic stores in Japan.

Hiroshi Fujiwara, DJ,  (Tiny Panks) DJ, Mixmaster Morris, Towa Tei of Deelite, and Timothy Leary were early adopters of Anarchic Adjustment fashion. 
Hiroshi featured "Anarchic" in his Fujiwara Adjustment section of Cutie Magazine and Timothy Leary wore "Anarchic" whenever he could.

References

Clothing brands of the United States
Clothing companies established in 1986
Companies disestablished in 1996
1986 establishments in the United Kingdom
Defunct companies of the United Kingdom